Tatiana Vasilyevna Badanina (born 1955, in Nizhny Tagil, Sverdlovsk Region, Russia) is a Russian visual artist.

Biography
Tatiana Badanina was born in 1955 in Nizhniy Tagil in the Ural region of Russia. She studied fine art at the Graphic Art Faculty of Nizhniy Tagil State Teacher's Training College between 1973—1978 and begun participating in art exhibitions in 1978. She taught at Nizhniy Tagil State Teacher's Training College between 1978 – 1991 She has been living and working in Moscow since 1997. She is an honorary Member of the Russian Academy of Arts.

Exhibitions
 1991 Painting. Union Gallery, Moscow, Russia (jointly with V. Nasedkin and S. Brukhanov)
 1993 Nizhniy Tagil State Museum of Fine Arts, Nizhniy Tagil, Russia
 1993 Yekaterinburg Museum of Fine Arts, Yekaterinburg, Russia (jointly with V. Nasedkin)
 1995 Yekaterinburg Museum of Fine Arts, Yekaterinburg, Russia
 1996 Kino Gallery, Cinema Centre, Moscow, Russia
 1997 Kino Gallery, Moscow, Russia
 1999 Graphic Centre of the Artist's Union, Vilnus, Lithuania
 1999 Kaliningrad State Art Gallery, Kaliningrad, Russia (jointly with V. Nasedkin and N. Zarovnaya)
 1999  RosIzo Gallery, Moscow, Russia
 2002 The Russian Gallery, Tallinn, Estonia
 2003 Wings. Sam Brook Gallery, Moscow, Russia
 2004 Skies. Masters Gallery, Moscow, Russia
 2005 Protective Veil. Action. Serafimo-Znamenskiy Skete. Moscow Region, Russia
 2007, Movement. Evolution. Art (group), The Ekaterina Cultural Foundation, Moscow
 2007 White Garments. Serafimo-Znamenskiy Skete. Moscow Region, Russia
 2007 Protective Veil. Materia Prima Gallery, Moscow, Russia
 2009 TRANZIT, Оber-gallery, Kent, USA (jointly with V. Nasedkin)
 2010 White Garments, Maris-Art Gallery, Perm, Russia  
 2012 proSVET (about light). Kultproject Gallery. Moscow, Russia
 2012 White Garments. Dedication...All-Russian Decorative – Applied and Folk Art Museum, Moscow, Russia
 2014, Are You Ready To Fly? (group), Moscow Museum of Modern Art
 2016, The Geometry of Light (joint), Erarta Museum of Contemporary Art

Collections
 The State Hermitage Museum, Saint-Petersburg, Russia
 Erarta Museum of Contemporary Art, St. Petersburg
 The State Tretyakov Gallery, Moscow, Russia
 The State Russian Museum, Saint-Petersburg, Russia
 The State Museum of Oriental Art, Moscow, Russia
 The State Central Museum of Contemporary History of Russia, Moscow, Russia
 Moscow Museum of Modern Art, Moscow, Russia
 The Jane Voorhees Zimmerli Art Museum, Rutgers University. New Brunswick, USA
 The Ekaterina Cultural Foundation, Moscow, Russia

Bibliography
 New album of graphics.1991.. Moscow
 The First Ural Print Art Triennial. 1995.. Ufa
 Die Kraft der Stille. Junge Kunst aus Rusland". 1996.(). Hildesheim. Deutschland
 Inter-kontak-grafik’98. LABYRINT".1998.. Prague.
 Abstract Art of Russia. ХХ century. 2001.(). Saint-Petersburg 
 Russian Gallery. 2004.. Tallinn, Estonia.
 Collage in Russia. ХХ Century. 2005.. Saint-Petersburg
 Female Artist of Moscow. Pathway in Arts, 2005 Moscow.
 XX Century Drawing. The State Tretyakov Gallery. 2006. Moscow
 Materials Revision. Catalogue (State Tretyakov Gallery) 2006. Moscow
 Different Reality - International Festival of Contemporary Arts. 2006.. Magnitogorsk
 Movement. Evolution. Art. Ekaterina Cultural Foundation. 2007.. Moscow
 New Angelarium, Catalogue. Moscow Museum of Modern Art. 2007. Moscow
 In Transition Russia 2008. 2008.. Moscow
 The First Ural Industrial Biennial of Contemporary Art. 2010. Yekaterinburg
 Memento Mori.2011.. Arkhangelsk
 Artists Union. Sverdlovsk-Yekaterinburg. 2011.Yekaterinburg
 Ural GRAFO. 2012 . Yekaterinburg
 848. Jorge Machare and Nadya Volkonskaya Collection. 2012 г.. The State Hermitage. Saint-Petersburg * 20th Century. The beginning of drama. 2012. Moscow
 Tvorchestvo (Creative work) Magazine № 7, 1988. A battle within us - article by T. Badanina
 Iskusstvo (Art) Magazine № 2, 1990. Nizhniy Tagil. T. Badanina and V. Nasedkin - article by V. Konstantinova
 Nauka v Rossii (Science in Russia) Magazine № 1, 2000. All is understood in comparison with the opposite - article by S. Khromchenko.
 Sobranie (Collection) Magazine № 2, 2004. An article by Igor Terekhov
 Decorativnoe Iskusstvo (Decorative Art) Magazine № 1, 2004. Image of flying - article by Vera Dazhina
 Decorativnoe Iskusstvo (Decorative Art) Magazine № 3, 2006. Overcoming the resistance of materials - article by V. Magomedova
 Decorativnoe Iskusstvo (Decorative Art) Magazine № 7, 2007. Through the wings of an angel - article by V. Magomedova  
 Decorativnoe Iskusstvo (Decorative Art) Magazine № 2, 2009. Metamorphoses of the Wonderland - article by A. Sapronenkova
 Decorativnoe Iskusstvo (Decorative Art) Magazine № 3, 2009. I am working with Sky -article by Vera Dazhina
 Decorativnoe Iskusstvo (Decorative Art) Magazine № 4, 2012. T.Badanina's «ProSvet»(About light)  in Kultproject – article by S. Terekhova
 Decorativnoe Iskusstvo (Decorative Art) Magazine № 5, 2012. Tatiana Badanina. White Metaphysics - article by V. Patsukov
In 2008, TATLIN published a book about the work of Tatiana Badanina, Editor: Anna Lengle, 200 pages, 22.0х28.5 см, 110 illustrations, hard cover, text in Russian/English.

See also
 List of Russian artists

References

External links
 Tatiana Badanina website
 Monumental Artist's website http://www.monumental-art.ru/badanina/index.htm
 Polina Lobachevskaya Gallery https://archive.today/20130417172004/http://plgallery.ru/tatyana-badanina
 Krokin Gallery http://www.krokingallery.com/russian/sproject.html
 Bluesquare Gallery http://www.galeriebluesquare.com/artist/11/Tatiana-Badanina
 Obergallery http://www.obergallery.com/BadaninaT.shtml http://www.4block.org/ru/museum/graphics/id740
 http://www.taday.ru/text/1017891.html
 http://ria.ru/art/20110429/369460847-print.html
 https://web.archive.org/web/20160305060318/http://simsop.ru/blog/paskha-v-moskve-2011
 http://rating.artunion.ru/

1955 births
Living people
People from Nizhny Tagil
Russian realist painters
Soviet realist painters